Max Plaxton is a Canadian cross-country mountain biker. At the 2012 Summer Olympics, he competed in the Men's cross-country at Hadleigh Farm, but did not finish due to a knee injury. He raced the entire 2012 UCI XC world cup and had a career best finish in France breaking into the top ten in elite. His main sponsor is Cannondale bikes.

References

Canadian male cyclists
Cross-country mountain bikers
Living people
Olympic cyclists of Canada
Cyclists at the 2012 Summer Olympics
1985 births
Cyclists at the 2014 Commonwealth Games
Commonwealth Games competitors for Canada
Canadian mountain bikers
Pan American Games silver medalists for Canada
Pan American Games medalists in cycling
Cyclists at the 2011 Pan American Games
Medalists at the 2011 Pan American Games